Annekal Reserved Forest is a protected area in the Western Ghats, India.

Reserved forests of India
Protected areas with year of establishment missing